Mauduit may refer to:

 William Mauduit, 8th Earl of Warwick (1220–1267), English nobleman, participant in the Barons' War
 Jacques Mauduit (1557–1627), French composer
 Israel Mauduit (1708–1787), British merchant, wrote Considerations On The Present German War
 Jasper Mauduit, agent of the Province of Massachusetts Bay 1762—1765
 Ronald Mauduit (1895–1928), British World War I flying ace
 Chantal Mauduit (1964–1998), French mountaineer
 Georges, Vicomte de Mauduit (1893-1945), French airman and author